The Thames River is a short river and tidal estuary in the state of Connecticut. It flows south for  through eastern Connecticut from the junction of the Yantic River and Shetucket River at Norwich, Connecticut, to New London and Groton, Connecticut, which flank its mouth at Long Island Sound.

History 

The river has provided important harbors since the mid-17th century. It was originally known as the Pequot River after the Pequot Indians who dominated the area. Other early names for the river have included Frisius, Great, Great River of Pequot, Little Fresh, Mohegan, New London, and Pequod. The town was officially named New London in 1658 and the estuary river was renamed Thames after the River Thames in London, England.

The United States Coast Guard Academy, Connecticut College, a U.S. Navy submarine base, and the Electric Boat submarine shipyard are located on the river at New London and Groton.  was launched into the river on January 21, 1954 from Electric Boat, becoming the world's first nuclear-powered submarine.

Two historic forts overlook the mouth of the river at New London harbor, now Connecticut State Parks: Fort Griswold on the eastern Groton Heights, and Fort Trumbull on the New London side.

Events
The Harvard-Yale Regatta is held annually in New London. New London's Sailfest is an annual event which includes OpSail, a gathering of large sailing vessels including the Coast Guard training ship .

Crossings

See also

List of Connecticut rivers
River Thames—London, England, United Kingdom

References 

 
Estuaries of Connecticut
Long Island Sound
Montville, Connecticut
New London, Connecticut
Rivers of Connecticut
Rivers of New London County, Connecticut
Rowing venues in the United States